Ilyinovka is a rural locality (a village) in Pokrovsky Selsoviet, Fyodorovsky District, Bashkortostan, Russia. The population was 32 as of 2010.

Geography 
Ilyinovka is located 21 km from Fyodorovka, 1 km from Pokrovka.

References 

Rural localities in Fyodorovsky District